Rising City is a village in Butler County, Nebraska, United States. The population was 374 at the 2010 census.

History
Rising City was established in 1878 when the Omaha and Republican Valley Railway was extended to that point. It was named for A. W. and S. W. Rising, the original owners of the town site.

Geography
Rising City is located at  (41.198628, -97.295829).

Demographics

2010 census
At the 2010 census there were 374 people, 153 households, and 114 families in the village. The racial makeup of the village was 97.6% White, 1.3% from other races, and 1.1% from two or more races. Hispanic or Latino of any race were 3.2%.

Of the 153 households 32.0% had children under the age of 18 living with them, 59.5% were married couples living together, 11.1% had a female householder with no husband present, 3.9% had a male householder with no wife present, and 25.5% were non-families. 22.2% of households were one person and 11.7% were one person aged 65 or older. The average household size was 2.44 and the average family size was 2.85.

The median age in the village was 40.6 years. 25.7% of residents were under the age of 18; 5.1% were between the ages of 18 and 24; 24.3% were from 25 to 44; 26.2% were from 45 to 64; and 18.7% were 65 or older. The gender makeup of the village was 51.3% male and 48.7% female.

2000 census
At the 2000 census there were 386 people, 158 households, and 103 families in the village. The population density was 1,043.9 people per square mile (402.8/km). There were 174 housing units at an average density of 470.6 per square mile (181.6/km).  The racial makeup of the village was 99.48% White, 0.52% from other races. Hispanic or Latino of any race were 0.52%.

Of the 158 households 31.6% had children under the age of 18 living with them, 58.2% were married couples living together, 3.8% had a female householder with no husband present, and 34.8% were non-families. 31.6% of households were one person and 20.3% were one person aged 65 or older. The average household size was 2.44 and the average family size was 3.07.

The age distribution was 25.9% under the age of 18, 8.3% from 18 to 24, 27.2% from 25 to 44, 21.2% from 45 to 64, and 17.4% 65 or older. The median age was 38 years. For every 100 females, there were 99.0 males. For every 100 females age 18 and over, there were 94.6 males.

The median household income was $31,786, and the median family income  was $38,750. Males had a median income of $25,625 versus $21,667 for females. The per capita income for the village was $15,264. About 3.0% of families and 6.8% of the population were below the poverty line, including 4.9% of those under age 18 and 5.4% of those age 65 or over.

Notable people
 Cliff Hillegass, founder of CliffsNotes
 Walter Judd, U.S. Representative

References

External links 
Historical images of Rising City and photos of Albert W. Rising and Samuel W. Rising  - Nebraska Memories

Villages in Butler County, Nebraska
Villages in Nebraska